The Lister Heights are rock heights on the east side of Stratton Glacier,  southwest of Flat Top in the western part of the Shackleton Range, Antarctica. They were first mapped in 1957 by the Commonwealth Trans-Antarctic Expedition (CTAE) and named for Hal Lister, a glaciologist with the transpolar party of the CTAE in 1956–58, and leader at the expedition's advance base, South Ice, in 1957.

References

Mountains of Coats Land